Ian Sagaitu is a Fijian former professional rugby league footballer who represented Fiji at the 1995 World Cup, playing in all three matches at the tournament.

References

Living people
Fijian rugby league players
Fiji national rugby league team players
Rugby league hookers
Rugby league second-rows
Fijian people of Rotuman descent
1972 births